John Paul Schaefer (born September 17, 1934) is an American academic. He was the president of the University of Arizona from 1971 to 1982. Having attended New York University Polytechnic School of Engineering and the University of Illinois, he was a chemistry professor. He is also a photographer, having worked with Ansel Adams.

References

Living people
1934 births
Presidents of the University of Arizona
New York University alumni
University of Illinois Urbana-Champaign alumni